Pütürge or Pötürge is a district of Malatya Province of Turkey. The mayor is Mehmet Polat (AKP).

Composition 
The district is populated by Kurds (both Alevi and Sunni).

References

Populated places in Malatya Province
Districts of Malatya Province
Kurdish settlements in Turkey